Balarabe Shehu Kakale is a Nigerian politician, doctor and later entered politics. He served as Commissioner of Health and Bulged planhing in Sokoto State and then became member house of Assembly, representing Dange Shuni, Tureta and Bodinga federal constituency in Sokoto State   and is the currently chairman House Committee on Nigeria/Brazil Parliamentary Relations.

References

Living people
Year of birth missing (living people)
Place of birth missing (living people)
Nigerian politicians
Politicians from Sokoto State